Yüreğir is a district-municipality in the Adana Province of Turkey. It is the second most populated district of the province with a population of over 400,000, mostly concentrated  on the east side of the Seyhan river, within the city of Adana.

Etymology
Yüreğir tribe is a branch the  Oğuz Turks, from whom most of the Anatolian Turks are descended.

History
Yüreğir tribe was the first Turkish tribe to settle in Cilicia  starting from 1352.  They came to the area in flight from Mongol invasions of their homelands in central Asia. They founded villages, at today's Yüreğir district. Adana was subsequently settled and resettled by many other peoples including other Turkish dynasties but they were first and the name was given to the area in their memory much later (in the early 20th century).

Governance
Yüreğir district is administered by three levels of government; central government, provincial administration and the Yüreğir Municipality.

Yüreğir Governorship is the district branch of the central government operating under the Adana Governorship. The chief executive of the Yüreğir district is the District Governor who is appointed by the Ministry of Internal Affairs. Yüreğir Governorship overseas the functioning of the district directorates of the ministries.

Yüreğir directorate of the Adana Province Special Administration is the district branch of the provincial administration. Yüreğir district is represented with 8 members at the 61-member Adana Provincial Parliament.

Yüreğir district is divided into urban neighbourhoods and former villages which are now called rural neighbourhoods.

Yüreğir Municipality
Yüreğir Municipality was incorporated in 1986 as a lower-tier municipality as Adana Municipality is upgraded to a metropolitan status. The organs of the Yüreğir Municipality are the mayor, encümen (the executive committee) and the municipal council.

Mayor is the chief executive of the municipality, presides municipal departments and chairs the municipal council. Mayoral candidates are either nominated by National Parties or run independently. The mayor is elected by first past the post voting for a 5-year term. Mahmut Çelikcan is the mayor of Yüreğir since 2009.  In the local elections on March 29, 2009, he was elected with %35 of the popular votes. The turnout was a high of %82.8, where the total number of registered voters were 256,616.

|-
|1  
|AKP
|align="right"|Mahmut Çelikcan
|align="right"|71,494
|align="right"|35.36
|-
|3
|CHP
|align="right"|Turgay Develi
|align="right"|52,139
|align="right"|25.79
|-
|2
|MHP
|align="right"|Recai Doğan
|align="right"|43,592
|align="right"|21.56
|-
|4
|DTP
|align="right"|Mehmet Zeki Karataş
|align="right"|20,820
|align="right"|10.3
|-
|5
|SP
|align="right"|Ömer Faruk Gerger
|align="right"|7,386
|align="right"|3.65

Encümen is the executive committee of the Yüreğir Municipality.The mayor presides the encümen and the committee consists of 7 members, 3 councilors elected from the municipal council, 3 department directors appointed by the mayor and the treasurer.

Municipal Council is the decision making organ of the Yüreğir Municipality. It is responsible for approving by-laws, founding, splitting or amalgamating neighborhoods, strategic planning, urban development planning and zoning, making investments, budgeting, loaning and controlling the mayor's activities. The chair of the council is the mayor. The council consists of 37 members. The candidates for the councilor positions are either nominated by National Parties or run independently. The councilors are elected by the d'Hondt method, where the whole municipality is one electoral district and there is 10% threshold for a party to gain seat at the council. As with mayor, councilors are elected for a 5-year term. Conservative AKP leads the council with 20 members, left leaning CHP  have 9 members and far-right Turkish nationalist MHP have 8 members at the council.

Neighborhoods
Neighborhoods (Mahalle) are administered by the muhtar and the Neighborhood Seniors Council consisting of 4 members. Muhtar and the Senior Council are elected for 5 years at the local elections and are not affiliated with political parties. Neighborhoods are not an incorporation therefore do not hold government status. Muhtar although being elected by the residents, acts merely as an administrator of the district governor. Muhtar also voices the neighborhood issues to the municipal hall together with the Seniors Council.

Yüreğir has total of 99 neighborhoods, 38 of them in the urban area, 61 are outside the urban area. The neighborhoods outside the urban area are the former villages and the municipalities that annexed to the city of Adana as city borders are expanded in 2008.

Neighborhoods in the urban area
The urban neighborhoods of Yüreğir are spread into 6 distinctive zones. The major separators of these zones are the D400 state road, Yüreğir Canal, Kozan Street, Mustafakemalpaşa Boulevard.

Karşıyaka: Settled in the late 19th century, Karşıyaka is the first expansion of Adana to the east bank of Seyhan River. It is bordered by D400 state road on the north, Seyhan river on the west and Yüreğir Canal on the east. Traditionally an Arabic area, Karşıyaka has seen mass migration of Kurds during the 1990s. Yüreğir District Hall, Adana State Hospital and Asri Cemetery are located in this zone. 14 neighborhoods of this zone are:Cumhuriyet, Yamaçlı, Seyhan, Haydaroğlu, Bahçelievler, Akdeniz, Güneşli, Anadolu, Dede Korkut, Yunus Emre, 19 Mayıs, Yeşilbağlar, Koza and Başak.
 
 
West of the Yüreğir Canal: Bounded with Seyhan river on the west, Mustafakemalpaşa Boulevard on the north, Yüreğir Canal on the east and D400 state road on the south, this zone is getting increasingly important, with the bridges that were built on the river and the extension of Adana Metro. An urban redevelopment under effect to convert Sinanpaşa and Yavuzlar neighborhoods into modern commercial and residential areas. Yüreğir Municipal Hall and Yüreğir Bus Terminal are located in this zone. The 5 neighorhoods of this are: Sinanpaşa, Sarıçam, Özgür, Yavuzlar and Akıncılar. Total population of the zone is 48270.

North of Mustafakemalpaşa Boulevard: This zone is another area of Yüreğir that is facing urban transformation. It will be converted into a modern residential area in which 2000 houses will be demolished and replaced by high rise buildings. Bordered by Mustafakemalpaşa Boulevard on the south, Seyhan river on the west, motorway on the north and Çukurova University property on the east, this zone will be home to Adana Court of Justice and 47.5 hectare Health Campus. 6th corps of the 2nd army is also based at this zone. The 3 neighborhoods of this zone are: Kışla, Köprülü and Kazım Karabekir. Total population is 34294.

West of the Kozan Street: Bounded by Kozan street on the east, Yüreğir Canal on the south, Çukurova University property on the west and Yeşil Boulevard on the north, this zone has 6 neighborhoods: PTT Evleri, Karacaoğlan, Selahaddin Eyyubi, Serinevler, Tahsilli and Dadaloğlu.

East of the Kozan Street: This zone is bordered by Kozan street on the west, Yüreğir Canal on the south-west, D400 state road on the south, İncirlik Air Base on the east. The 10 neighborhoods of this zone are: Yıldırım Beyazıt, Remzi Oğuz Arık, Ulubatlı Hasan, Kiremithane, Dervişler, Şehit Erkut Akbay, Çamlıbel, Yenidoğan, Mutlu and Atakent.

South of the D400: Bounded by D400 state road on the road and Yüreğir Canal on the west, this zone has 2 neighborhoods: Levent and Güzelevler.

Neighborhoods outside the urban area
As the city borders expanded the municipalities and villages in the new limits of the city  are annexed to the city. Neighborhoods of the former municipalities and former villages then became part of the Yüreğir district as neighborhoods. There are total of 61 non-urban neighborhoods which are located on the east and south end of Yüreğir.

Abdioğlu: 9 neighborhoods of this former municipality are, Büyükkapılı, Cumhuriyet, Çotlu, Düzce, Esenler, Herekli, Kütüklü, Özler, Yahşiler

Doğankent: 10 neighborhoods of this former municipality are, Ağzıbüyük, Bahçelievler, Cumhuriyet, Danişment, Denizkuyusu, Gazipaşa, Kışla, Pekmezli, Sağdıçlı, Şeyhmurat

Geçitli: Cumhuriyet, Havraniye

Havutlu: – The 7 neighborhoods of this former municipality are Ali Hocalı, Aydıncık, Havutlu, Kayarlı, Köklüce,Taşcı, Yukarı Çiçekli

İncirlik: Cumhuriyet

Kürkçüler: Camili, Dedepınar

Solaklı: 16 neighborhoods of this former municipality are Akdam, Atatürk, Beyköy, Cumhuriyet, Çağırkanlı, Eğriağaç, Gökçeli, Hürriyet, Kamışlı, Köprügözü, Paşaköy, Sazak, Şahinağa, Yalnızca, Yenice, Zağarlı

Yakapınar – Located on the west bank of Ceyhan river, its two neighborhoods are Eski Misis and Yakapınar

Yunusoğlu – The 12 neighborhoods of this former municipality are Cırık, Cine, Cumhuriyet, Gümüşyazı, Hacıali, Hürriyet, Irmakbaşı, Kadıköy, Karaahmetli, Sakızlı, Yeniköy, Yerdelen.

Culture
Two cultural centres in Yüreğir host theatres, concerts, exhitibitions and conferences. There are two public libraries in the district: Yüreğir and Ramazanoğlu Public Library.

Yüreğir Cultural Centre in the Kazım Karabekir neighborhood, has the largest hall in Adana with 1000-seater, that is mostly used for conferences. The centre also two other conference halls, both seating 200. The centre is owned and operated by the Yüreğir Municipality.

Ramazanoğlu Cultural Center, in the Karşıyaka quarter, is a cultural centre of the Ministry of Culture and Tourism. The centre has a theatre hall, library and two exhibition halls. Adana Town Theatre performs regularly at the centre.

Sports
Serinevler Arena is a multi-sport arena, located in the Serinevler neighborhood. The arena has a spectator capacity of 2500. Serinevler Athletics Stadium, situated just east of the arena, is a venue for athletics. Peyami Safa Maracı stadium, located in the Karşıyaka quarter, is used for football games. Yavuzlar Sports Hall in the Yavuzlar neighbourhood is a venue for basketball, volleyball and handball.

Adana Equestrian Club, located in the Kışla neighborhood, is the largest centre for horse riding in Turkey, hosting national and international show jumping competitions.

Transport
Adana Metro has two stations in Yüreğir; Cumhuriyet station in the Karşıyaka quarter and Akıncılar station next to the Yüreğir Coach Terminal. There are bus transfer grounds on both of the metro stations.

Yüreğir is served by three railway stations. The railway station at the central Yüreğir is the Kiremithane railway station. The station is served by one regional and one long-distance line. The other stations are the İncirlik and the Yakapınar.

Yüreğir Coach Terminal is home to the regional bus and minibus companies that serve to the eastern towns of Çukurova. The coach terminal is in Akıncılar neighborhood, off the D400 State Road.

References

 
Populated places in Adana Province
Districts of Adana Province
Cilicia